Doreen Mantle (born 22 June 1926) is a South African-born British actress who played Jean Warboys in One Foot in the Grave (1990–2000). She has appeared in many British television series since the 1960s, including The Duchess of Duke Street, The Wild House, Sam Saturday, Chalk, Casualty, The Bill, Doctors, Holby City, Lovejoy and Jonathan Creek. She played lollipop lady Queenie in Jam & Jerusalem (2006–09). She appeared in episode 63 of Father Brown in January 2018.

Mantle has worked extensively on the stage in such productions as My Fair Lady, Keep It in the Family, The Seagull and Hamlet. She also toured Britain in Billy Liar in the role of Florence Boothroyd and performed at the National Theatre in The Voysey Inheritance. In 1979, she was awarded the Laurence Olivier Award for Best Actress in a Supporting Role for her performance in Death of a Salesman. She has also undertaken radio work for BBC Radio 3 and BBC World Service. Mantle played the long suffering wife of the rabbi in BBC Radio 4's comedy series The Attractive Young Rabbi.

Mantle played Mrs Shaemen in Barbra Streisand's film version of Yentl (1983). From 2010 to 2011, Mantle appeared in Coronation Street as the mother of Colin Fishwick, whose identity was taken by John Stape.

Filmography

References

External links

1926 births
Actresses from Cape Town
English film actresses
English radio actresses
English television actresses
Laurence Olivier Award winners
Living people
South African television actresses